Hormiphora is a genus of comb jellies of the family Pleurobrachiidae. The genus was erected by Louis Agassiz in 1860.

References 

Pleurobrachiidae
Ctenophore genera